Frank Bartlet Adler (better known by his stage name Felix Adler; June 17, 1895 – February 1, 1960), was an American circus performer and entertainer. Known as "The King of Clowns", he performed for Ringling Bros. Barnum & Bailey for 20 years. He was inducted into the International Clown Hall of Fame in 1989.

Life

Felix Adler was born in Clinton, Iowa on June 17, 1895. He became interested in performing at age 9, when a circus visited his hometown.

Adler and his wife, Amelia, ran the first American husband-and-wife independent circus, and he was the second clown to appear on television after Sombris Aremelo, an Italian clown.

Amelia Adler appeared, in costume and makeup, as a guest on April 10, 1955 episode of the American television quiz program, What's My Line?  Adler also appears as a clown in the 1952 film The Greatest Show on Earth.

In addition to his "King Of Clowns" moniker, Adler was known as "The White House Clown" for his number of command performances before United States Presidents.

His outlandish costumes often featured a huge grossly exaggerated posterior, made from two inflated beach balls held in place by a brassiere-like canvas sling.

Identified in the annals of Clowndom as a "Whiteface" clown, his exclusive "face" was easily differentiated from other clowns by a sparkling rhinestone embedded in the tip of his red putty nose.

During his career, Adler performed before millions of circus fans in the United States. 

His image was placed onto at least two classic Ringling Bros. and Barnum & Bailey Circus posters, and a commercial mask resembling this face was created and sold by Verne Langdon.

He died at Saint Clare's Hospital in New York on February 1, 1960, following surgery on an ulcer. He is buried in Springdale Cemetery in Clinton, Iowa.

Recognition

Felix Adler was once photographed by American designer Charles Eames for the latter's visual slide presentation accompanied by circus music, a photograph which today retains fame in the form of a cover for the compact disc Circus Clown Calliope! Vols. 1&2. He founded the "Ethical Culture Movement" with his brother, Felix Adler. 

He was inducted into the International Clown Hall of Fame in 1989.

References

1895 births
1960 deaths
American clowns
People from Clinton, Iowa
Ringling Bros. and Barnum & Bailey Circus people